This article refers to a town in Haiti. For the French chess master, see Alexandre Deschapelles.

Deschapelles is a town in the Verrettes commune, in the Artibonite department of Haiti. It is located approximately 54 km north of the capital, Port-au-Prince, and has 4 to 5000 inhabitants Approximately. Deschapelles is where the Hôpital Albert Schweitzer Haiti is located.

Education 
Centre D'etudes Secondaire de Deschapelles (CESD)

Ecole Nationale du Borel

Ecole Mixte le Pelerin

Ecole Mixte Gerald

Sister Cities
 Essex, Connecticut, United States

References

External links
 Hôpital Albert Schweitzer Haiti

Populated places in Artibonite (department)